The 2001 Coupe de la Ligue Final was a football match held at Stade de France, Saint-Denis, on 5 May 2001 that saw Olympique Lyonnais defeat AS Monaco FC 2-1 thanks to goals by Caçapa and Patrick Müller.

Match details

See also
2000–01 Coupe de la Ligue

External links
Report on LFP official site

2000–01 in French football
2001
Olympique Lyonnais matches
AS Monaco FC matches
May 2001 sports events in France
Sport in Saint-Denis, Seine-Saint-Denis
Football competitions in Paris
2001 in Paris